Tsering Dhundup (born 21 February 1982) is a Tibetan football player and political activist from Dehradun. The midfielder plays for the Tibet national football team since 2007. Dhundup is top scorer since the 6-0 victory of Tibet against Delhi XI, on 4 August 2007, since the foundation of the Tibetan team in 1999.

Dhundup is spokesperson of the Tibetan Youth Congress. In February 2008,  Dhundup was arrested at the UN funded Tibetan Reception Centre in Kathmandu.  He was held in a cell by the Nepalese immigration department, before being handed back to the Chinese authorities, at the Tibet-Nepal border at Tatopani. Exiled Tibetans and supporters have demanded his release.

See also
Tibet national football team
Tibetan culture

References

TNFA, team 2007
 Shaolin Soccer Foot au Tibet, team 2008

External links
 
Tibetan National Sports Association (TNSA)

Indian footballers
Tibetan footballers
Tibet international footballers
1982 births
Living people
People from Uttara Kannada
Footballers from Karnataka
Indian people of Tibetan descent
Association football midfielders